Manasellam is a 2003 Indian Tamil-language romantic drama film written and directed by Santhosh. Produced by V. Ravichandran, it stars Srikanth and Trisha, while Cochin Haneefa plays a major supporting role. The film score and soundtrack were composed by Ilaiyaraaja. It was released on 20 March 2003 and failed both critically and commercially. It got dubbed as Manasantha in Telugu.

Plot
On his way to Chennai, Bala's bag and certificates get stolen in the train. But he has a look about him that endears him to a petty shop owner Sundaram, who provides him accommodation along with a few bachelors in the top portion of his house. Malar stays opposite this house, and the bachelors are crazy about her. They are scared if the handsome and cheeky Bala will try to woo her, so they hatch a plot and frame him so that Malar's two brothers beat him up black and blue. Three strangers, who claim to be his true friends from Hyderabad, save an unconscious Bala.

Now, the true identity of Bala is told in a flashback by these friends, that he is a rich son of an industrialist. Malar saves Bala from an accident, and soon they are in love. But her brothers take her back to Chennai, as their sister had already eloped with someone. The brothers do not want her to commit the same mistake and make her promise that she will only marry someone of their choice. Also, it is revealed that Malar is suffering from some brain disease and will die soon. Knowing this only, Bala has come to stay opposite her house with the hope of seeing and making her happy till the end. Malar's health condition worsens, and she gets admitted to hospital with minimal chances of survival. Bala leaves the hospital crying as he does not want to see Malar die in front of him. The movie ends there.

Cast 

 Srikanth as Bala 
 Trisha as Malar
 Cochin Haneefa as Sundaram
 Nizhalgal Ravi as Malar’s elder brother 
 Anand as Malar’s elder brother 
 Rajeev as Bala's father
 Fathima Babu  as Bala's mother
 Vaiyapuri as Bachelor
 Shyam Ganesh as Bachelor
 Sukran as Bachelor
 Chandra Lakshman
 Chaplin Balu as Murugan
 Scissor Manohar
 Baby Akshaya
 Besant Ravi
 Ilavarasu
 Laxmi Ratten as Doctor

Production
Vidya Balan was initially selected to play the heroine but was subsequently replaced by Trisha. Shooting took place at Vijaya Vauhini Studios in Chennai.

Soundtrack

Reviews
Nanjilonline wrote: "On the whole Manasellam leaves you with a migraine". Bizhat praised the performances: "Trisha, snatches everyone's attention with her flashing smile. Srikanth has delivered his role very comfortably and carries the movie elegantly proving to find his hand over all type of roles and now rolling to reels". Hindu wrote: "Manasellam has the ingredients of an entertaining fare — but the worn-out storyline and trying sequences are stumbling blocks".

Box office
The film opened in 2 screens in inner Chennai.

References

2003 films
Films scored by Ilaiyaraaja
Indian romantic drama films
2000s Tamil-language films
2003 romantic drama films